Julian Grey (born March 1, 2006) is an American actor. Most recently, Grey can be seen in  The Matrix Resurrections (2021) as Brandon, the teenage son of Tiffany (Carrie-Anne Moss). Grey can also be seen in Blumhouse's The Craft: Legacy (2020) as Abe, the youngest son of Adam (David Duchovny), and in Searchlight Pictures dark comedy Downhill as Finn, the fearless son of Will Ferrell and Julia Louis-Dreyfus. In television, Grey can be seen in the Netflix award-winning limited series Godless (2017) written and directed by Scott Frank, as well as Fox's Wayward Pines (2016).

Background
Grey was born in Los Angeles, California, to a German father and American mother, and holds German and American citizenship. Grey has a twin sister along with an older brother and older half-sister.

Career
Grey made his professional acting debut at the age of 10 in a 2016 episode of the Fox supernatural series Wayward Pines opposite Melissa Leo. Later that year, Grey went on to a recurring role in the Netflix Emmy-winning western miniseries Godless (2017) opposite Scoot McNairy and Merritt Wever.

In 2017, Grey was cast in a drama pilot, Crash & Burn, based on the Michael Hassan bestselling book of the same name.

In January 2019, Grey began filming Searchlight Pictures dark comedy Downhill set in the Austrian Alps. He portrays Finn, the son of Will Ferrell and Julia Louis-Dreyfus. Directed by Nat Faxon and Jim Rash, "Downhill" premiered at Sundance in January 2020 followed by a theatrical release in February.

In October 2019, Grey began filming Blumhouse's The Craft: Legacy portraying Abe. The film premiered on premium VOD in North America  (where theaters were closed due to a global pandemic) on October 28, 2020, followed by a theatrical release internationally.

Shortly after wrapping on The Craft: Legacy, Grey worked on Revelation, a short film about a manic teen.

In February 2020, Grey began filming  The Matrix Resurrections directed by Lana Wachowski. Grey portrays Brandon, the teenage son of Tiffany and Chad, opposite Thomas Anderson/Neo (Keanu Reeves), Tiffany/Trinity (Carrie-Anne Moss), and Chad (Chad Stahelski). On December 18, 2021, Grey attended the U.S. Premiere of the film in San Francisco.

Filmography

Film

Television

References

External links
 
 

American male television actors
Living people
2006 births
American male film actors
American male voice actors
American male child actors
21st-century American male actors